The electoral history of John Kerry, Lieutenant Governor of Massachusetts (1983–1985), United States Senator (1985–2013), United States Secretary of State (2013–2017), and 2004 Democratic presidential nominee.

U.S. House of Representatives election

1972

Massachusetts gubernatorial election

1982

U.S. Senate elections

1984 

thumb|Election results by municipality

1990

1996

2002

2008

Presidential election

2004

References

John Kerry
Kerry, John